Heijō Shrine (平壌神社, Heijō jinja) was a Shinto shrine in Pyongyang during the Japanese colonial rule in Korea. Its name derived from the Japanese name for Pyongyang during its occupation of Korea. It was established in 1913, and was defunct after 1945. The shrine's main annual festival was held on October 2.

It was formerly a national shrine of the third rank (国幣小社, kokuhei shōsha) in the Modern system of ranked Shinto Shrines.

In modern times, the site is a park, with a statue of Kim Il-Sung built at the site of the shrine's building.

External links
Historical page with photographs
Overseas shrines database

Religious organizations disestablished in 1945
Religious organizations established in 1913
Religious buildings and structures completed in 1913 
1945 disestablishments in Japan
1913 establishments in Japan
Shinto shrines in Korea
Korea under Japanese rule
History of Pyongyang
Culture in Pyongyang
20th-century Shinto shrines